Scopula emma is a moth of the family Geometridae. It was described by Prout in 1913. It is found in China and Taiwan.

Subspecies
Scopula emma emma
Scopula emma jordani (West, 1930) (Taiwan)

References

Moths described in 1913
emma
Moths of Asia
Moths of Taiwan